The 2010 Great West Conference baseball tournament took place from May 26 through 29. This was the first Great West Conference baseball tournament. All eight of the league's teams met in the round robin tournament held at University of Texas–Pan American's Edinburg Stadium in Edinburg, Texas. Utah Valley won the championship by a score of 4-3. As the Great West is a new conference, the league does not have an automatic bid to the 2010 NCAA Division I baseball tournament.

Seeding and format 
The league's eight teams were seeded by conference winning percentage, with head to head matchups used for tiebreakers. The teams were then divided into two pools with the winners of each pool meeting in a single elimination final.

Results 

Northern Colorado advanced to the championship game by virtue of its head to head win over Texas–Pan American.

All-Tournament Team 
The following players were named to the All-Tournament Team.

Most Valuable Player 
Chris Benson was named Tournament Most Valuable Player. Benson was an outfielder for Utah Valley.

References 

Tournament
Great West Conference baseball tournament
Great West Conference Baseball